Ireland competed at the 1988 Summer Paralympics in Seoul, South Korea. 53 competitors from Ireland won 42 medals including 13 gold, 11 silver and 18 bronze and finished 19th in the medal table.

See also 
 Ireland at the Paralympics
 Ireland at the 1988 Summer Olympics

References 

Ireland at the Paralympics
1988 in Irish sport
Nations at the 1988 Summer Paralympics